The North Kosovo crisis may refer to:

 North Kosovo crisis (2011–2013)
 North Kosovo crisis (2021)
 North Kosovo crisis (2022)